No Rewind is the debut album by the Orchestra, released in 2001.

Overview
The album was recorded without financial support from any record labels and was produced by Eric Troyer, Parthenon Huxley and Jim Jacobsen. Ten tracks and more were recorded in studios in Los Angeles and New York over a -year period. No Rewind contains the Bev Bevan co-authored composition "Over London Skies", "The Diary of Horace Wimp" soundalike "Jewel & Johnny", and a cover of "Twist and Shout" which begins in a slow, plaintive minor key with arpeggiated chords before building to the familiar, rocking major progression.

The album was originally only available during their UK tour in 2001. It was reissued in 2004 in Argentina under the label Art Music and again in 2006 in the UK (with no label) with an edited track 10.

theLogBook.com noted the album as being very beatlesque and also noted the song "Can’t Wait To See You" as "close as one can imagine to a lost Jeff Lynne song".

Cover art
Three versions were released with three different cover designs. The first pressing cover art was simply silver/grey with the band logo in black in the style of the Beatles logo. The second, designed by band guitarist Parthenon Huxley, showed a reel-to-reel tape deck carved in stone. The third was designed by George Reed, the long-time art/film director for both ELO Part II and the Orchestra. This edition pictures a man standing at a computer console as it spills out piles of data tape with the words NO REWIND spelled out in L.E.D. letters on an indicator screen. Throughout the image are several hidden references to the band's past.

Track listing

Personnel
Personnel according to the booklet.
Kelly Groucutt – bass, vocals
 Eric Troyer – keyboards , vocals
 Parthenon Huxley – guitar , vocals
 Gordon Townsend – drums
 Mik Kaminski – violin
 Louis Clark – keyboards
Additional personnel

 Jim Jacobsen – engineer, mixer
 John Regna – executive producer
 James O'Connell – engineer ("Jewel & Johnny", "Before We Go")
 CJ de Villar – mixer ("Jewel & Johnny", "Before We Go")
 Stephane Guyot – string session engineer
 Greg Calbi – mastering

References

2001 debut albums
The Orchestra (band) albums